Neidalia dulcicula is a moth of the family Erebidae first described by William Schaus in 1929. It is found in Brazil.

References

Phaegopterina
Moths described in 1929